Esmaeil Haj Rahimipour is an Iranian former footballer who played as a midfielder for Persepolis and the Iran national football team.

Effectiveness in Derby

In the Tehran derby on 7 September 1973 between Persepolis and Taj (now known as Esteghlal), Haj Rahimipour was influential on 5 goals. The match finished 6–0 in favor of Persepolis.

References

1951 births
Living people
Iranian footballers
Iran international footballers
Persepolis F.C. players
Association football midfielders